During the Parade of Nations portion of the 2000 Summer Olympics opening ceremony, athletes from each country participating in the Olympics paraded in the arena, preceded by their flag. The flag was borne by a sportsperson from that country chosen either by the National Olympic Committee or by the athletes themselves to represent their country.

Parade order
As the nation of the first modern Olympic Games, Greece entered the stadium first; whereas, the host nation of Australia marched last. Other countries entered in alphabetical order in the language of the host country (English), according with tradition and IOC guidelines.

Whilst most countries entered under their short names, a few entered under more formal or alternative names, mostly due to political and naming disputes. Macedonia entered as "Former Yugoslav Republic of Macedonia'" because of the naming dispute with Greece. The Republic of China (commonly known as Taiwan) entered with the compromised name and flag of "Chinese Taipei" under T so that they did not enter together with conflicting People's Republic of China (commonly known as China), which entered as the "People's Republic of China" under C. The Republic of the Congo entered as just "Congo" while the Democratic Republic of Congo entered with its full name. Iran, Micronesia, Moldova, Laos, Brunei and the United States all entered under their formal names, respectively "Islamic Republic of Iran", "Federated States of Micronesia", "Republic of Moldova", "Lao People's Democratic Republic", "Brunei Darussalam" and "United States of America".

A record of 199 nations entered the stadium with the exception of Afghanistan, a nation banned by the IOC in 1999 because of the extremist rule of the Taliban's oppression on women and its sports. The parade of nations also featured a unified entrance by the athletes of the North and South Korea, holding a specially designed unification flag: a white background flag with a blue map of the Korean peninsula; however, the two teams competed separately. Four athletes from East Timor marched directly in the opening ceremonies as individual Olympic athletes before the host nation. Without the existence of the National Olympic Committee, they were allowed to compete under the Olympic flag.

Notable flag bearers in the opening ceremony featured the following athletes: windsurfer Nikolaos Kaklamanakis (Greece), Olympic beach volleyball champion Sandra Pires (Brazil), tennis player Nicolás Massú (Chile), heavyweight boxing champion Félix Savón (Cuba), long-distance runner Derartu Tulu (Ethiopia), sprint kayaker and five-time gold medalist Birgit Fischer (Germany), coxless pairs rower and double gold medalist Matthew Pinsent (Great Britain), show jumper Princess Haya (Jordan), discus thrower and 1992 Olympic champion Romas Ubartas (Lithuania), dressage rider Anky van Grunsven (Netherlands), middle-distance runner Vebjørn Rodal (Norway), two-time Greco-Roman wrestling champion Andrzej Wroński (Poland), five-time rowing champion Elisabeta Lipă (Romania), four-time Olympic handballer Andrey Lavrov (Russia), six-time Olympic water polo player Manuel Estiarte (Spain), and basketball players Carlton Myers (Italy) and Andrew Gaze (Australia).

List
The following is a list of each country's announced flag bearer. The list is sorted by the order in which each nation appears in the parade of nations. The names are given in their official designations by the IOC.

References

See also
 2004 Summer Olympics national flag bearers
 2008 Summer Olympics national flag bearers
 2008 Summer Paralympics national flag bearers
 2010 Winter Olympics national flag bearers

Flag bearers
Lists of Olympic flag bearers